Bigneck, also known as Big Neck, is an unincorporated community in Keene Township, Adams County, Illinois, United States. The community is served by Illinois Route 61. There remain about two houses in the community and no businesses. Bigneck once had a post office which is now defunct. A. Otis Arnold (1878–1941), Illinois businessman and politician, was born near Bigneck, in Adams County.

References

Unincorporated communities in Adams County, Illinois
Unincorporated communities in Illinois